Kevin Lankinen (born 28 April 1995) is a Finnish professional ice hockey goaltender for the Nashville Predators of the National Hockey League (NHL).

Playing career

Liiga
Lankinen has played primarily for HIFK of the SM-liiga, from 2014 to 2018. He also played one match for Jokerit and two for KooKoo, and ten for Kiekko-Vantaa of Mestis.

In 2014, Lankinen signed a three-year contract with HIFK. In the 2015 playoffs, he participated in the longest game in SM-liiga's history, lasting 134 minutes and 14 seconds. His team won 2–1 and advanced to the quarterfinals.

Summer 2015 Lankinen participated to New York Islanders Development camp 

During the 2015–16 season, Lankinen played alongside Ville Husso, playing 22 games in the regular season, as well as three in the playoffs as his team won silver medals. During the 2016–17 season, Lankinen was a secondary goaltender alongside the more experienced Niklas Bäckström, but due to Bäckström's injuries, he became the primary goaltender and played in 42 games, seven of which were shutouts, the most in the league that season.

During the 2017–18 season, Lankinen was injured and unable to play for a large portion of the season. However, he made a successful comeback by playing 15 games in the regular season with four shutouts and a save percentage of 94.58 percent. His goals against average (GAA) was 1.33, the highest in the league that season. During the playoffs, he played as the primary goaltender for 13 games with a save percentage of 93.56 percent, helping his team win bronze medals. He was in the running for the Urpo Ylönen trophy, which is awarded to the best goaltender of the season, alongside Veini Vehviläinen from Oulun Kärpät and Dominik Hrachovina from Tappara, but the award went to Vehviläinen.

Chicago Blackhawks
On 21 May 2018, Lankinen (who had not been selected in NHL Entry Draft) signed a two-year entry-level contract with the Chicago Blackhawks of the National Hockey League (NHL).

In his second season with the Blackhawks affiliate, the Rockford IceHogs in the 2019–20 season, Lankinen made 21 appearances, earning 8 wins and represented the IceHogs as the teams' lone representative at the 2020 AHL All-Star Game. On 5 March 2020, Lankinen was ruled out for the remainder of the season after undergoing shoulder surgery, with a recovery period of 5 months.

On 19 January 2021, Lankinen made his NHL debut, losing 5–4 in overtime to the Florida Panthers. On 22 January, Lankinen got his first NHL win in a 4–1 win against the Detroit Red Wings. His first NHL shutout came on 17 February, in the Blackhawks' 2–0 win over the Detroit Red Wings. His season total was 17-14-5.

During the season Lankinen served as a backup to Marc-André Fleury. With the team being 0-7-2, Lankinen struggled quite a bit. He didn’t make his first win until November 7, 2021 in a game against the Nashville Predators. When Fleury got traded he became starter, making the team go 5-9-3 since Fleury's trade. He ended the season  with a 8-15-6 record and 3.50 goals against average.

Nashville Predators
As a free agent from the Blackhawks, on 14 July 2022, Lankinen was signed a one-year, $1.5 million contract with the Nashville Predators. On 3 March 2023, the Predators signed Lankinen to a one-year, $2 million contract extension.

International play

In 2019, Lankinen represented Finland in the Ice Hockey World Championships, winning gold. Throughout the tournament, he had the second highest save percentage (after Andrei Vasilevskiy) of 94.20% and a goals against average of 1.50. He served as the goaltender for each playoff game.

Personal life
Lankinen likes to read and names "Sapiens" by Yuval Noah Harari as his favorite book. One other favorite of his is "The Dirt" – an autobiography of Mötley Crüe. Lankinen has opened a Facebook-based book club with Finnish publisher WSOY.

Career statistics

Regular season and playoffs

International

Awards and honours

References

External links
 

1995 births
Living people
Chicago Blackhawks players
Finnish ice hockey goaltenders
HIFK (ice hockey) players
Indy Fuel players
Jokerit players
Imatran Ketterä players
Kiekko-Vantaa players
KooKoo players
Nashville Predators players
Rockford IceHogs (AHL) players
Ice hockey people from Helsinki
Swedish-speaking Finns
Undrafted National Hockey League players